Togakushi can refer to either 

Togakushi, Nagano, a village in Japan,
Togakushi Shrine, a shrine in Togakushi, Nagano